The following is an incomplete list of association football clubs based in Mali.
For a complete list see :Category:Football clubs in Mali

A
Africa Sports de Gao
Atar Club
Avenir (Ségou)
Avenir (Timbuktu)

B
AS Bakaridjan de Barouéli (Ségou)
AS Bamako (Bamako)
AS Biton (Ségou)
US Bougouni

C
CAS de Sévaré
JS Centre Salif Keita (Bamako)
Cercle Olympique de Bamako (Bamako) - abbreviation and common form: COB

D
Débo Club de Mopti
Djoliba AC (Bamako)
CS Duguwolofila de Babanba (Koulikoro)

F
al Farouk (Timbuktu)

J
Jeanne d'Arc FC
Jeunesse Sportive (Ségou)

K
Kayésienne - now part of AS Sigui
Association Sportive de Korofina (Bamako)

M
Mamahira AC (Kati)
AS Mandé (Bamako)
AS Mandé (women) (Bamako)

N
AS Nianan (Koulikoro)

O
Office du Niger Sports
AS Olympique de Messira
Onze Créateurs de Niaréla (Bamako)

P
AS Police (Bamako)

R
Real Bamako, Association Sportive (Bamako)

S
Sabana
AS Sigui - Kayés
Sonni AC (Gao)
Stade Malien (Bamako)
Stade Malien de Sikasso

T
AS Tata National (Sikasso)
Tibo Club (Mopti)

U
Union Sportive des Forces Armées et Sécurité de Bamako

Women's clubs 

 AS Mandé (women)

 
Mali
Football
Football clubs